Ilmārs is a Latvian masculine given name and may refer to:
Ilmārs Bricis (born 1970), Latvian biathlete 
Ilmārs Liepiņš (1947–2007), Latvian footballer
Ilmārs Rimšēvičs (born 1965), Latvian economist
Ilmārs Poikāns (born 1978), Latvian artificial intelligence researcher
Ilmārs Starostīts (born 1978), Latvian chess Grandmaster
Ilmārs Verpakovskis (born 1958), Latvian footballer

Cognates
Ilmar, a similar, Estonian masculine given name
Ilmari, a similar, Finnish masculine given name

Latvian masculine given names